Shomo may refer to:

Caleb Shomo (born 1992), lead vocalist of hardcore punk band Beartooth, the former lead vocalist, keyboardist of vintage crabcore/electronicore band Attack Attack! and the owner of Studio Records in Columbus, Ohio
Vince Shomo (born 1940), American amateur light welterweight champion for 1957, 1958 and 1960. See list
William A. Shomo or William Arthur "Bill" Shomo (1918–1990), United States Army Air Forces fighter pilot during World War II

See also
Adonai-Shomo, the name given to a commune which existed from 1861 to 1896 in Massachusetts, USA
Shomo Rock, a nunatak lying between the Ricker Hills and Pape Rock in the Prince Albert Mountains, Oates Land, East Antarctica